Kainer is a surname. Notable people with it include:

 Don Kainer (born 1955), American former professional baseball player
 Lene Schneider-Kainer (1885–1971), Jewish-Austrian painter
 Ludwig Kainer (1885–1967), German graphic artist, draftsman, painter, illustrator, film architect and costume designer